

The Holyrood Thermal Electric Generating Station built by Newfoundland and Labrador Hydro Corporation is located near the community of Holyrood, in Conception Bay, Newfoundland, Canada.

Overview
The initial installation included two 150 megawatt (MW) turbine generators which are propelled by steam heated by two large oil burning furnaces.  The Number 6 fuel oil used in the plant to keep the furnaces going is delivered by shuttle tankers to the marine terminal constructed as part of the project.

In an average year it puts out pollution equivalent to 300,000 cars on the road.

In a thermal generating station, fuel is burned in a boiler to convert water to steam. The high-pressure steam is directed into a turbine that is connected to an electrical generator that produces electricity as it turns. A seawater condenser is used for cooling the spent steam from the turbine, converting it back to water that is reused in the boiler.  Holyrood uses over 250,000 litres per minute of sea water for cooling on each unit and 900,000 litres per day of fresh water for make up purpose.

The plant generators operate at 16,000 volts and 7000 amperes transformed up to 230,000 volts for transmission on the island grid to all parts of the system. It generates on average 15 to 25% of Newfoundland’s electricity—up to 30% of the island’s electricity needs at peak in the winter months.

The plant has three smokestacks, one 360 ft (109.8 m) tall and two 300 ft (91.5 m) tall. These are the tallest freestanding structures built on land in Newfoundland.

History
Holyrood was placed in service in 1971 with two 150 MW units. A third 150 MW unit was added in 1980 to increase the output to 450 MW. In 1988/89 the original two units were modified to increase the plant capacity to 490 MW. In 2014, a 123.5 MW diesel combustion turbine was installed.

See also

 List of power stations in Canada
 List of tallest structures in Canada

References

Oil-fired power stations in Newfoundland and Labrador
Newfoundland and Labrador Hydro